The Beethoven concert of 22 December 1808 was a benefit concert held for Ludwig van Beethoven at the Theater an der Wien in Vienna that featured the public premieres of Beethoven's Fifth and Sixth Symphonies, the Fourth Piano Concerto and the Choral Fantasy. This concert, then called an Akademie, occurred in a very cold hall and lasted for approximately four hours. Its featured performers were an orchestra, chorus, vocal soloists, and the composer was featured as soloist at the piano. Beethoven biographer Barry Cooper refers to the concert, in terms of its content, as the "most remarkable" of Beethoven's career.

Background
Conditions for the performance of symphonic music in the Vienna of 1808 were hardly optimal, as Robert Kahn explains:

In Vienna, the theaters were either under government sponsorship (the Burgtheater and the Kärntnertortheater, both in central Vienna) or were private enterprises located in the outer districts of the city. Beethoven's chosen venue, the Theater an der Wien, was in the latter category. It was a very substantial building, described as "the most lavishly equipped and one of the largest theatres of its age." It had opened to rave reviews in 1801; for instance, the Allgemeine musikalische Zeitung called it the "most comfortable and satisfactory in the whole of Germany" (which meant at the time, "all German-speaking lands"). Beethoven had already premiered several of his most important works to date in this theater; for a listing see Theater an der Wien.

During 1807 and 1808, Beethoven had provided his works and services to a series of charity concerts at the Theater an der Wien. The Theater's director, Joseph Hartl, ultimately permitted Beethoven to use the venue for the 22 December 1808 concert, which was for Beethoven's private benefit. Beethoven had lobbied for a private benefit concert for many months—in return for his participation in the charity concerts—and expressed frustration at what he perceived to be Hartl's procrastination on the matter.

The Wiener Zeitung carried an advertisement for the concert on 17 December 1808, labelling it a "musical Akademie"; this was the common term for a concert in Beethoven's time.

Programme

The concert commenced at 6:30pm and lasted for approximately four hours, with an interval separating two sessions. The programme was as follows:

Of the non-premiered works, "Ah! perfido" had been composed in 1796. The C major Mass had been premiered the previous year in Eisenstadt under the auspices of Prince Esterházy.

The Choral Fantasy was the last of the works to be composed; it was barely finished in time for the concert, leaving insufficient opportunity for rehearsal. Its role in the concert was as the concluding work, bringing together pianist, choir and orchestra.

The two movements from the Mass in C were not advertised in the programme as such, due to restrictions on performing church music in theatres.

The program would strike most concertgoers today as being extraordinarily long. Yet in Beethoven's time, this was perhaps not so; Lowe writes:

Thus is it possible that the difficulty of the concert for listeners may have arisen from the need to take in a whole series of complex and original works (see critical reactions below), as well as the cold.

Musical forces
Forced to squeeze in his benefit concert at a very busy time, Beethoven was handicapped in summoning adequate musical forces. In principle, he had access to the professional orchestra of the Theater an der Wien, but many of its members had a conflicting engagement: the Tonkünstler-Societät, a benevolent society for the widows and orphans of musicians, was putting on one of its four annual oratorio performances at the Burgtheater. The Society generally required its members to participate in its benefit concerts or pay a fine; this reduced the number of skilled professionals available, and amateurs were required to fill the gaps. The orchestra thus available to Beethoven was a moderately sized ensemble that is likely to have had in the order of six to eight first violins for the evening. Amateur and semi-professional concerts of the period saw larger orchestras.

Beethoven was the pianist for the concerto, the improvised fantasia and the Choral Fantasy. Never again would Beethoven appear as a soloist in a piano concerto: his declining hearing would render it impossible. Contemporary accounts describe Beethoven as the conductor of the orchestra; however, it is possible that Beethoven only had limited direction over the orchestra, and the orchestra had refused to rehearse under his baton.

Performance

By all accounts, the execution of the music was inferior. One review targeted the orchestra, saying that it "could be considered lacking in all respects". The soloist for the "Ah! perfido" scene and aria was an inexperienced teenaged soprano hastily engaged for the concert after Anna Milder, his first choice for the role, dropped out because Beethoven insulted her. The performance by the young substitute soprano was hampered by stage fright.

An aggravating factor for the audience was the extremely cold weather.

Probably the low point in the performance occurred during the Choral Fantasy, which had been insufficiently rehearsed; adherence to the score fell apart at one point, leading Beethoven to stop and restart the piece. Ignaz von Seyfried later wrote:,

This part of Seyfried's account emphasizes the humor of the situation, but there were also some negative consequences for Beethoven. Seyfried goes on:

Critical responses

In this troubled venture Beethoven did enjoy the advantage that many in the audience were enthusiasts for his music and eager to attend. One such was the composer Johann Friedrich Reichardt, who was visiting Vienna. He later wrote (in his Personal Letters Written on a Trip to Vienna, 1810):

Prince von Lobkowitz was a patron and supporter of Beethoven. Reichardt goes on to say:

Reichardt's opinion echoed that of the Allgemeine musikalische Zeitung:

The concert provoked the ire of fellow composer Antonio Salieri, who had been Beethoven's teacher. Also on 22 December, Salieri organized his annual concert to benefit widows and orphans, and he threatened to ban any Tonkünstler-Societät musicians who had played in Beethoven's concert instead of his own. However, soon after the relationship between the two composers improved.

Financial results

Beethoven's biographer Thayer writes, "the pecuniary results of this concert to Beethoven are not known"; adding however that there is a record indicating that Prince Esterházy ordered "the sum of 100 gulden to be paid to Beethoven in support of this "musical Akademie."

Recreations

This concert's fame has resulted in modern recreations by various orchestras, such as:
 New Jersey Symphony Orchestra (May 1986)
 Historic Keyboard Society of Milwaukee (1994) 
 Baltimore Symphony Orchestra (October 1998)
 Royal Scottish National Orchestra (August 2001)
 Mostly Mozart Festival (August 2007)
 Vienna Radio Symphony Orchestra (22 December 2008)
 Festival de Lanaudière (July 2012)
 Melbourne Symphony Orchestra (May 2015)
 San Francisco Symphony (June 2015)
 BBC Scottish Symphony Orchestra (October 2016)
 Royal Northern Sinfonia (10 June 2017)
 University of the Pacific Symphony Orchestra and Combined Choruses (November 11, 2017)
 Chorus and Orchestra of the Pfalztheaters Kaiserslautern (April 2018)
 PianoEspoo Festival (10 November 2019)
 Vienna Symphony (11 January 2020)
 Welsh National Opera Orchestra and BBC National Orchestra of Wales (19 January 2020)
 Balthasar Neumann Ensemble & Chor (7 February 2020, Dortmund; and 9 February 2020, Hamburg)
 Cincinnati Symphony Orchestra (29 February 2020 and 1 March 2020)
 Philharmonia Orchestra (15 March 2020)

References

Sources

Ludwig van Beethoven
Benefit concerts
1808 in the Austrian Empire
1808 in music
Events in Vienna
19th century in Vienna
December 1808 events
Classical music concerts